Pobladura de las Regueras is a locality and minor local entity located in the municipality of Igüeña, in León province, Castile and León, Spain. As of 2020, it has a population of 184.

Geography 
Pobladura de las Regueras is located 92km west-northwest of León, Spain.

References

Populated places in the Province of León